Dizoniopsis abylensis is a species of sea snail, a gastropod in the family Cerithiopsidae, which is known from the Strait of Gibraltar. It was described by Bouchet, Gofas and Warén, in the year 2010.

References

Cerithiopsidae
Gastropods described in 2010